Hetti Kemerre Perkins (born 1965) is an art curator and writer. She is the eldest daughter of Australian Aboriginal activist Charles Perkins and German Eileen Munchenberg, a granddaughter of Hetty Perkins, sister to film director Rachel Perkins and brother Adam Perkins, and mother to actress Madeleine Madden. Hetti Perkins is an Eastern Arrernte and Kalkadoon woman from Central Australia, she attended Melrose High School in Canberra, with her sister.

Hetti Perkins was the curator of Aboriginal and Torres Strait Islander art at the Art Gallery of New South Wales in Sydney for thirteen years, but resigned from the job in 2011. She was a member of the International Selection Committee for the Biennale of Sydney in 2000. In 2010 she made a three-part ABC documentary called Art + Soul that was shown by ABC in October 2010 (which was also shown as "Aborginernas konst" on Sveriges Television).

Bibliography 
 Yanada (New Moon). (1993) In association with the Boomalli Aboriginal Artists Cooperative. .
 True Colours: Aboriginal and Torres Strait Islander artists raise the flag. (1994) In association with the Boomalli Aboriginal Artists Cooperative. 
 Papunya Tula: Genesis and Genius. (2000) Eds. Hetti Perkins and Hannah Fink. Art Gallery of NSW in association with Papunya Tula Artists. .
 Tradition Today: Indigenous art in Australia. (2004) .
 Crossing Country: the alchemy of Western Arnhem Land art. (2004) .
 Contemporary Aboriginal Art: the Mollie Gowing Acquisition Fund. (2006) .
 One Sun One Moon: Aboriginal Art in Australia. (2007) Eds. Hetti Perkins and Margaret West. Sydney: Art Gallery of New South Wales. .
 Half light: Portraits from Black Australia. (2008) .
 Nganana Tjungurringanyi Tjukurrpa Nintintjakitja (We are here sharing our dreaming). (2009) In association with Papunya Tula Artists. .
 Art + Soul: a journey into the world of Aboriginal art. (2010) .

External links 
 Bangarra Dance Theatre
 SciNews: Hetti Perkins joins Ninti One as Deputy Chair

References 

Australian curators
1965 births
Living people
Australian people of German descent
Australian people of Irish descent
Arrernte people
Australian women curators
Art curators